Richard Jerome Kokos, born Kokoszka (February 28, 1928 – April 9, 1986), was an American professional baseball outfielder. In a 5-year, 475-game career, he compiled a .263 batting average (410-1558) with 239 runs, 59 home runs, 223 RBI, an on-base percentage of .365 and a slugging percentage of .441. Kokos was originally a Cleveland Indians prospect, and was traded on November 20, 1947 with $25,000, Joe Frazier, and Bryan Stephens for Walt Judnich and Bob Muncrief.

References

External links

1928 births
1986 deaths
Baltimore Orioles players
Baseball players from Chicago
Batavia Clippers players
Kansas City Blues (baseball) players
Major League Baseball outfielders
Miami Marlins (IL) players
Nashville Vols players
Omaha Cardinals players
St. Louis Browns players
Toledo Mud Hens players
Wilkes-Barre Barons players